Maria Domitilla Galluzzi (1595–1671) was a Catholic mystic, never canonized. According to E. Ann Matter, her foremost chronicler, Galluzzi entered her convent at Pavia, and after some time, began to experience ecstatic visions of Christ's Passion. Amongst other miraculous events, levitation is alleged to have occurred when Galluzzi rose to view a crucifix of Christ's Passion agonies through supernatural means.

Matter notes that Galluzzi's work is based on the spiritual disciplines of Ignatius Loyola, although the seventeenth-century church investigated her for orthodoxy. However, while Galluzzi survived this scrutiny, her mysticism and piety was never recognized through beatification as a Catholic saint, due to Counter-Reformation Catholic rationalist tendencies and sceptical reception of alleged ecstatic visions. It may be instructive to compare her life to her contemporary, Cecilia Ferrazzi (1609–1684), to whom she bears many similarities and differences.

References
E. Ann Matter: "Discourses of Desire: Sexuality and Christian Women's Visionary Narratives": Journal of Homosexuality 18 (1989–90): 119–132.
E. Ann Matter: "Theories of the Passions and the Ecstacies of Late Medieval Religious Women" in Lisa Perfetti (ed) The Representation of  Women's Emotions in Medieval and Early Modern Culture: Gainesville: University Press of Florida: 2005:

See also
Cecilia Ferrazzi

1595 births
1671 deaths
Roman Catholic mystics